Þrír Blóðdropar was an album released in 1992 by Icelandic rock singer, Megas, through Skífan.
Formed by 16 songs Þrír Blóðdropar, which in Icelandic means “Three Drops of Blood”, counted with the participation of Bubbi Morthens for the song “Ég Get Líka (Boðlegir Vinir - Vænlegir Synir)”, Móeiður Júníusdóttir collaborated in “Rósin” and finally, the additional collaboration of guitar player Guðlaugur Kristinn Óttarsson and drummer Sigtryggur Baldursson.

Track listing

External links
Official site of Bubbi Morthens
Official site of Guðlaugur Kristinn Óttarsson
Page of G. K. Óttarsson at MySpace.com
Official site of Sigtryggur Baldursson

1992 albums
Megas albums